Nowhereisland was an artwork by artist Alex Hartley, produced by the Bristol-based arts organisation, Situations. Nowhereisland was an ‘Artists Taking the Lead’ project, funded by Arts Council England as part of the London 2012 Cultural Olympiad.

The work involved the discovery of a new island that had been revealed from within the melting ice of a retreating glacier on the Svalbard peninsula in Norway.  The island was taken out into International Waters by an expedition team, where it was declared a new nation. This new nation - Nowhereisland - was towed around the South West coast of England prior to and during the 2012 Olympic Games.

The project was designed to examine democracy and investigate what a borderless nation might look like. On its website (now defunct) Hartley explained that the Island "seeks to redefine what a nation can be. Nowhereisland embodies the global potential of a new borderless nation, which offers citizenship to all; a space in which all are welcome and in which all have the right to be heard. Nowhereisland’s constitution is and will be cumulative and consensual, open to all citizens and subject to change during the nation’s lifetime." The project encouraged people to sign up as citizens and contribute to the creating of the constitution and objectives of the new nation.

At the end of Nowhereisland's journey, in September 2012, the island was broken up and distributed amongst the 23,003 people from 135 countries signed up as "citizens of Nowhereisland". Situations director Claire Doherty stated "It’s the ultimate form of citizenship...for ever more, the people of Nowhereisland will not just belong to the nation, they will own a part of it, too.”

As a final gesture, a small piece of the island was sent to the edge of space, where some particles of rock from the island will remain in the upper-stratosphere.

References

External links

2012 Cultural Olympiad
British art